Krasonice is a municipality and village in Jihlava District in the Vysočina Region of the Czech Republic. It has about 200 inhabitants.

History
The first written mention of Krasonice is from 1286.

References

Villages in Jihlava District